Robertville Baptist Church is a historic Southern Baptist church located at the junction of U.S. 321 and CR 26 (historic Sister's Ferry road) in Robertville, Jasper County, South Carolina. It was built about 1847, and is a one-story, small frame building with Greek Revival and Gothic Revival details. The portico is supported by two plain Doric order columns.  The building was originally occupied by the Ascension Episcopal Church of Gillisonville, and purchased by Robertville Baptists and moved to its present location about 1867. Robertville Baptist Church was organized in 1781 and considered  the "Mother of Churches" in the area.

It was added to the National Register of Historic Places in 1972.

References

Baptist churches in South Carolina
Churches on the National Register of Historic Places in South Carolina
Churches completed in 1847
Greek Revival church buildings in South Carolina
Carpenter Gothic church buildings in South Carolina
19th-century Baptist churches in the United States
Buildings and structures in Jasper County, South Carolina
National Register of Historic Places in Jasper County, South Carolina
1847 establishments in South Carolina
Southern Baptist Convention churches